The Order of Time may refer to:

The Order of Time (album), by American singer and songwriter Valerie June
The Order of Time (book), by Italian theoretical physicist and writer Carlo Rovelli